Ali Mohamed Sanad Jaffer (born 24 June 1955) represented South Yemen in the boxing competition at the 1988 Summer Olympic Games in the featherweight event. His first match ended when the referee stopped the contest in the second minute of the opening round.

1988 Olympic results
Below is the record of Ali Mohamed Jaffer, a featherweight boxer from South Yemen who competed at the 1988 Seoul Olympics:

 Round of 64: lost to Wanchai Pongsri (Thailand) referee stopped contest in the first round

References

External links
 

Boxers at the 1988 Summer Olympics
1955 births
Living people
Yemeni male boxers
Olympic boxers of South Yemen
Featherweight boxers